Isabella of Scotland, Duchess of Brittany (1426–1494/1499) was the daughter of James I of Scotland and Joan Beaufort.

Isabella of Scotland (or Isabel or Isobel) may also refer to:

Isabella of Scotland, Countess of Norfolk (1195–after October 1263), daughter of William the Lion and Ermengarde de Beaumont
Isobel of Huntingdon (1199–1251), daughter of David, Earl of Huntingdon, and Matilda of Chester
Isabel Stuart (1676–1681), daughter of James VII of Scotland and Mary of Modena